John Paley (February 6, 1871 – December 23, 1907) was a Russian-born American Yiddish writer and newspaper editor.

Early Life

Early life
Paley was born on February 6, 1871, in Plieščanicy, Minsk Governorate, Russia, the son of Hyman Paley and Chaye Chortow. His father later worked as principal of a Yiddish school in Rochester, New York.

Education
Paley's father gave him a traditional education. When he was thirteen, he entered the Volozhin Yeshiva. He then spent two years in Liepāja, where he acquired a secular education. He then went to Kaunas and studied in Rabbi Yitzchak Elchanan Spektor's yeshiva. He later moved to Moscow and worked as manager of a commercial house. He allegedly converted to Christianity at one point, but he immigrated to New York City in 1888 and returned to Judaism.

Work
Paley's first novel, Die Russische Helden, was published in the Folksadvocat. He then joined their staff and later became its editor. In 1892, he became editor of the Yiddishe Presse in Philadelphia. In 1894, he became a founder and publisher of the Folksvechter back in New York. When that paper was sold, he joined the staff of the Yiddishes Tageblatt, working with that paper until he died. Under him, the paper was opposed to socialism. As editor of the paper, he manufactured stories for the paper. During the Spanish–American War, he dug up incidents from the Spanish Inquisition and printed them in the paper as if they only occurred the day before. He once tricked a Jewish peddler to eat fried oysters with him, and when he told the peddler he ate unkosher food he threw up the food and lay sick in bed for several days. The next day, Paley reported a story about a gang of anti-Semites who stuffed oysters down a Jewish peddler's throat until the peddler died of suffocation. When the truth came out, he accused atheists were trying to ruin him. His employer was Kasriel Sarasohn.

Paley also wrote dramas "The Russian Nihilist" and "Life in New York," "Die Schwarze Chevrah," "Uriel Acosta," "Mysteries of the East Side," "The Erev Rav," "Yichus und Verbrechen," and "Das Leben in New York."

Personal Life
Paley was married to Sophia Amchaintzky.

Death
Paley died at home in Brooklyn from gas asphyxiation on December 23, 1907. The police initially reported the death a suicide, but the coroner found the death to be accidental. He was buried in Washington Cemetery.

References 

1871 births
1907 deaths
People from Borisovsky Uyezd
People from Lahoysk District
American people of Belarusian-Jewish descent
Jews from the Russian Empire
Emigrants from the Russian Empire to the United States
Yiddish-language journalists
American male journalists
19th-century American newspaper editors
20th-century American newspaper editors
Jewish American journalists
Editors of Pennsylvania newspapers
Journalists from New York City
Editors of New York City newspapers
Burials in New York (state)
Deaths from asphyxiation
Accidental deaths in New York (state)